Chrysobothris chrysoela is a species of metallic wood-boring beetle in the family Buprestidae. It is found in North America.

Subspecies
These two subspecies belong to the species Chrysobothris chrysoela:
 Chrysobothris chrysoela chrysoela
 Chrysobothris chrysoela lerneri Cazier, 1951

References

Further reading

 
 
 

Buprestidae
Articles created by Qbugbot
Beetles described in 1800